Climacteris is a genus of bird in the family Climacteridae. 
These birds and the other members of the family, genus Cormobates, are similar to Northern Hemisphere creepers, Certhiidae, in climbing helically up tree trunks looking for insect food.  Differences from Cormobates are

Climacteris species have black, slightly downcurved bills.
They have a rusty chest stripe in the female.  (In Cormobates the female is marked on the face.)
They have simple vocal repertoires that are the same for both sexes.
They lay heavily marked pinkish eggs (Simpson and Day 1999).
They are cooperative breeders; male offspring of previous broods and sometimes other individuals help breeding pairs (Doerr 2003).

It contains the following species:

The Australian author G. M. Mathews published new generic names in 1912, based on characteristics that distinguished two species from this genus,
 Whitlocka, to describe the black-tailed northwestern species, Climacteris melanurus. The generic epithet honoured the ornithologist F. Lawson Whitlock.
Neoclima, assigning the species Climacteris picumnus, brown treecreeper, of Temminck as the type.

References

 
 Peterson, Alan P. (Editor). 1999. Zoological Nomenclature Resource (Zoonomen). Accessed 2007-08-30.
 

 
Climacteridae
Bird genera